Elvir Muriqi (born May 10, 1979) is an Albanian boxer.

Background
Muriqi was born in Kosovo and moved to the United States in 1996 with his family to escape the growing tension in Kosovo. He boxed as an amateur in his homeland but never had a chance to become known outside Kosovo . Muriqi turned professional in New York.

Professional boxing record

| style="text-align:center;" colspan="8"|40 Wins (24 knockouts, 15 decisions),  7 Losses (1 knockout, 5 decisions, 1 disqualification), 0 Draws
|-  style="text-align:center; background:#e3e3e3;"
|  style="border-style:none none solid solid; "|Res.
|  style="border-style:none none solid solid; "|Record
|  style="border-style:none none solid solid; "|Opponent
|  style="border-style:none none solid solid; "|Type
|  style="border-style:none none solid solid; "|Rd., Time
|  style="border-style:none none solid solid; "|Date
|  style="border-style:none none solid solid; "|Location
|  style="border-style:none none solid solid; "|Notes
|- align=center
|Loss
|align=center|40-7||align=left| Sean Monaghan
|
|
|
|align=left|
|align=left|
|- align=center
|Loss
|align=center|40-6||align=left| Blake Caparello
|
|
|
|align=left|
|align=left|
|- align=center
|Win
|align=center|40-5||align=left| Paul Vasquez
|
|
|
|align=left|
|align=left|
|- align=center
|Win
|align=center|39-5||align=left| Chris Grays
|
|
|
|align=left|
|align=left|
|- align=center
|Win
|align=center|38-5||align=left| Daniel Judah
|
|
|
|align=left|
|align=left|
|- align=center
|Win
|align=center|37-5||align=left| Tiwon Taylor
|
|
|
|align=left|
|align=left|
|- align=center
|Win
|align=center|36-5||align=left| Oleksandr Garashchenko
|
|
|
|align=left|
|align=left|
|- align=center
|Loss
|align=center|35-5||align=left| Clinton Woods
|
|
|
|align=left|
|align=left|
|- align=center
|Win
|align=center|35-4||align=left| Jameel Wilson
|
|
|
|align=left|
|align=left|
|- align=center
|Loss
|align=center|34-4||align=left| Antonio Tarver
|
|
|
|align=left|
|align=left|
|- align=center
|Win
|align=center|34-3||align=left| Derrick Reed
|
|
|
|align=left|
|align=left|
|- align=center
|Win
|align=center|33-3||align=left| Ted Muller
|
|
|
|align=left|
|align=left|
|- align=center
|Win
|align=center|32-3||align=left| Marlon Hayes
|
|
|
|align=left|
|align=left|
|- align=center
|Loss
|align=center|31-3||align=left| Oleksandr Garashchenko
|
|
|
|align=left|
|align=left|
|- align=center
|Win
|align=center|31-2||align=left| Caseny Truesdale
|
|
|
|align=left|
|align=left|
|- align=center
|Loss
|align=center|30-2||align=left| Danny Santiago
|
|
|
|align=left|
|align=left|
|- align=center
|Win
|align=center|30-1||align=left| Tony Menefee
|
|
|
|align=left|
|align=left|
|- align=center
|Win
|align=center|29-1||align=left| Charles Ward
|
|
|
|align=left|
|align=left|
|- align=center
|Win
|align=center|28-1||align=left| Thomas Reid
|
|
|
|align=left|
|align=left|
|- align=center
|Win
|align=center|27-1||align=left| James Crawford
|
|
|
|align=left|
|align=left|
|- align=center
|Win
|align=center|26-1||align=left| Tiwon Taylor
|
|
|
|align=left|
|align=left|
|- align=center
|Win
|align=center|25-1||align=left| Mike Coker
|
|
|
|align=left|
|align=left|
|- align=center
|Win
|align=center|24-1||align=left| Sam Ahmad
|
|
|
|align=left|
|align=left|
|- align=center
|Win
|align=center|23-1||align=left| Mike Coker
|
|
|
|align=left|
|align=left|
|- align=center
|Win
|align=center|22-1||align=left| Joseph Harris
|
|
|
|align=left|
|align=left|
|- align=center
|Win
|align=center|21-1||align=left| Erin Fitchett
|
|
|
|align=left|
|align=left|
|- align=center
|Win
|align=center|20-1||align=left| Darren Whitley
|
|
|
|align=left|
|align=left|
|- align=center
|Win
|align=center|19-1||align=left| Napoleon Pitt
|
|
|
|align=left|
|align=left|
|- align=center
|Win
|align=center|18-1||align=left| Ronald Boddie
|
|
|
|align=left|
|align=left|
|- align=center
|Win
|align=center|17-1||align=left| Gary Campbell
|
|
|
|align=left|
|align=left|
|- align=center
|Win
|align=center|16-1||align=left| Danny Sheehan
|
|
|
|align=left|
|align=left|
|- align=center
|Win
|align=center|15-1||align=left| Jason Dietrich
|
|
|
|align=left|
|align=left|
|- align=center
|Win
|align=center|14-1||align=left| Adrian Miller
|
|
|
|align=left|
|align=left|
|- align=center
|Loss
|align=center|13-1||align=left| Danny Sheehan
|
|
|
|align=left|
|align=left|
|- align=center
|Win
|align=center|13-0||align=left| Fermin Chirino
|
|
|
|align=left|
|align=left|
|- align=center
|Win
|align=center|12-0||align=left| Angelo Simpson
|
|
|
|align=left|
|align=left|
|- align=center
|Win
|align=center|11-0||align=left| Boyer Chew
|
|
|
|align=left|
|align=left|
|- align=center
|Win
|align=center|10-0||align=left| Steve Ussery
|
|
|
|align=left|
|align=left|
|- align=center
|Win
|align=center|9-0||align=left| Angelo Simpson
|
|
|
|align=left|
|align=left|
|- align=center
|Win
|align=center|8-0||align=left| Thomas Barker
|
|
|
|align=left|
|align=left|
|- align=center
|Win
|align=center|7-0||align=left| Marvin Ladson
|
|
|
|align=left|
|align=left|
|- align=center
|Win
|align=center|6-0||align=left| Walter David
|
|
|
|align=left|
|align=left|
|- align=center
|Win
|align=center|5-0||align=left| Eric Rhinehart
|
|
|
|align=left|
|align=left|
|- align=center
|Win
|align=center|4-0||align=left| Tyrone Wallace
|
|
|
|align=left|
|align=left|
|- align=center
|Win
|align=center|3-0||align=left| Johnny Walker
|
|
|
|align=left|
|align=left|
|- align=center
|Win
|align=center|2-0||align=left| Billy Desser
|
|
|
|align=left|
|align=left|
|- align=center
|Win
|align=center|1-0||align=left| Nicholas Robles
|
|
|
|align=left|
|align=left|
|- align=center

Notes

Awards
 Muriqi received a Sportsmanship award from Albanian Roots at the Albanian Roots Parade in the summer of 2013. 
 Muriqi has been advertised in the Albanian American Success Stories magazine.

References

External links

1979 births
Living people
Yugoslav emigrants to the United States
American people of Albanian descent
American people of Kosovan descent
Light-heavyweight boxers
Albanian male boxers
American male boxers